The Major League Soccer Caribbean Combine is an annual showcase of Caribbean football talent between the ages of 18-21 organized jointly by Major League Soccer and the Caribbean Football Union in 2013, with the inaugural combine being held in January 2014. All 31 member associations are encouraged to send representatives that fit the criteria.  The combine provides opportunities for Caribbean players to be observed by MLS scouts with the hopes of being invited to the MLS Combine, an invite-only showcase event held in Fort Lauderdale, Florida prior to the annual MLS SuperDraft. The combine is part of an agreement between the two entities as they try to promote football development throughout the Caribbean region. About the impact of Caribbean players on the league, MLS Technical Director Alfonso Mondelo said, "Quite a few players have played, continue to play in the MLS and have done so successfully...Now we are looking forward to the next generation of players who will be coming in", while MLS Executive Vice President Todd Durbin said, "We recognize that the CONCACAF area, and particularly the Caribbean, is rich with soccer talent, and this will be an opportunity for our scouts to evaluate and identify the region’s top players...Caribbean players from islands like Jamaica, Haiti, Grenada and others have been key performers in MLS. This event will help recognize the next generation of MLS stars as we look to achieve our goal of being among the best leagues in the world by 2022." From a Caribbean perspective, CFU President Gordon Derrick stated, "As CFU Member Associations turn their attention to Russia 2018, this is an exciting developmental opportunity for the opulent young talent in the Caribbean to assess their developmental level and the growth required to play at the highest level...This partnership with MLS is another way in which we at the CFU are seeking to bridge the gap that exists between talent availability and scouting opportunities that the Caribbean region has received from professional leagues."

2014 

The 2014 Caribbean Combine took place at the Antigua Recreation Ground in St. John’s, Antigua from January 2–4; and featured 24 players from 16 different Caribbean nations. Originally 32 players were nominated but eight were not invited to the final combine by the MLS technical team. The Trinidad and Tobago Football Association did not have any representatives at the combine after an "administrative error" lead to no paperwork being submitted to the CFU by the association. Of the 23 players who were invited, only Stefano Rijssel and Quinton Christina were invited to the MLS Combine. Rijssel went on to be the first ever player from the Caribbean Combine to be drafted after he was selected in the 3rd round, 55th overall, by Seattle Sounders FC. However, Rijssel was cut by the team during preseason and was ultimately not signed.

Players

Known rejected players

Drafted players

2015 
The 2015 Caribbean Combine was held between January 2–5, 2015 in Bayamón, Puerto Rico. The combine  took place at the facilities of Bayamón FC, including Juan Ramón Loubriel Stadium, and featured matches with local clubs. For the combine, 19 players representing 17 associations from the region were invited. Following the Caribbean Combine, only Jean Carlos Lopez Moscoso of the Dominican Republic was invited to the MLS Combine. No players from the Caribbean combine were selected as Lopez was not taken in any of the four rounds of the draft.

Players

Known rejected players

2016
The 2016 edition of the MLS Caribbean Combine was held on three different islands at different times, unlike previous years in which it was held at a central location. Players were invited to specific host islands based up their country of origin. Twenty four players were invited to each location for a total of 72 players, a significant increase over previous years. The reason for decentralizing the combine was to make it easier for more nations to participate.

Hosting and known players
Saint Kitts and Nevis hosted players from Anguilla, Antigua and Barbuda, British Virgin Islands, Cayman Islands, Jamaica, Montserrat, Puerto Rico, Turks and Caicos, and the United States Virgin Islands from 13 December to 16 December at the Warner Park Sporting Complex.

Curaçao hosted players from Aruba, Bahamas, Bermuda, Bonaire, Dominican Republic, Guyana, Haiti, Suriname, and Trinidad and Tobago from 17 December to 20 December. Ten total players from Aruba, Bonaire, the Dominican Republic, and Guyana attended in addition to ten Curaçao players who met the requirements.

Martinique hosted players from Barbados, Dominica, French Guiana, Grenada, Guadeloupe, St. Maarten, St. Martin, St. Vincent and the Grenadines, and St. Lucia from 1 January and 4 January.

2017
In October 2016 it was announced that the base of the 2017 MLS Caribbean Combine would be merged with the final round of CFU 2017 CONCACAF U-20 Championship qualification taking place that same month. The qualifiers would be attended directly by scouts from MLS teams, with representatives from at least the Philadelphia Union, Real Salt Lake, and Seattle Sounders FC confirmed to attend. The decision to combine the two events was logistical since many of the region's best young players and national teams from the desired age group would be participating. The new format meant that players from nations that were not part of the competition would not have the opportunity to be scouted at this edition of the combine.

2018
The combine returned to a single-venue, invite-only format in 2018. This edition of the combine was the first held outside of the Caribbean with the three-day event taking place at the Sawgrass Hotel and Suites Sports Complex outside of Fort Lauderdale, Florida from January 9–11, 2018. Chosen invitees will then attend the MLS Player Combine from January 11–17 in Orlando. In total, 22 players were invited to attend the event. Ultimately, no players from the Caribbean Combine were invited to the MLS Combine.

Players

2019
The 2019 MLS Caribbean Combine was held in Kingston, Jamaica from 15-18 October and in Bridgetown, Barbados from Oct. 22-25, 2018. Fifteen nations sent representatives to the combines. Addition details were released regarding compensation for players and former club, if applicable, if signed by an MLS club as a result of the combine. These details included the player’s club will receiving an Adidas allotment and a transfer fee of US $50,000 if the player’s MLS option for 2020 is exercised. Additional compensation was available to former club depending on the player's performance including US$25,000 after 15 official MLS appearances, $50,000 after 30 official MLS appearances, and $100,000  after 60 official MLS appearances. Finally, a player’s former club would receive 20% of any transfer fees received by the MLS within the first four years of the player’s employment in the league. Jamaican midfielder Peter-Lee Vassell was named MVP of the combine and was invited to the 2019 MLS Combine Vassell was then selected by Los Angeles FC with the 19th overall pick in the draft. He was later signed by the club for the 2019 Major League Soccer season, becoming the first player to ever be signed by a Major League Soccer side after featuring in the Caribbean Combine.

Known players

2020
The 2020 MLS Caribbean Combine took place in Kingston, Jamaica from December 2 to December 4, 2019.

Known players

Footnotes

References

See also 
 MLS Combine
 MLS SuperDraft

Caribbean Football Union
Combine